Events in the year 2019 in the Principality of Andorra.

Incumbents
 Co-Princes: Emmanuel Macron and Joan Enric Vives Sicília
 Prime Minister: Antoni Martí (from 2015 until 16 May) Xavier Espot Zamora (since 16 May)

Events
 7 April – Parliamentary elections were held in Andorra for all 28 seats of the General Council.

References

 
2010s in Andorra
Years of the 21st century in Andorra
Andorra
Andorra